Põhimaantee nr 2 (ofcl. abbr. T2) is a 280-kilometre-long north-south national main road in Estonia. The route follows the same path as the European route E263. The highway starts in Tallinn. From there the main cities passed are Kose, Paide, Põltsamaa, Tartu and Võru. The highway ends in Lüta on the intersection with the T7.

The road forms a major transport north-south transport route within Estonia, as it connects the two largest cities in Estonia. In 2020, the highest traffic volumes were around Tallinn, with the AADT there being around 25,000. The figures rise again around Tartu, hovering around 11,000.

The road is a dual carriageway for 70 kilometres. The main part is between Tallinn and Võõbu (64.2 kilometres). The remainder can be found near Mäo (5.9 kilometres) and near Tartu (1 kilometre). The dual carriageway stretch between Võõbu and Mäo is planned to be completed in 2022. The current road is a first in many road standard improvements: the first Estonian speed cameras were posted on the T2, also the first wildlife crossing in Estonia was completed in 2013.

Route description
The T2 (Estonian: põhimaantee 2) is a major north-south highway in Estonia connecting the capital of the country, Tallinn, to southern Estonia. The T2 is a part of the European route E263.

The route is currently regarded as dangerous for traffic, as (especially) the section between Tallinn and Mäo is full of dangerous blind corners.
The highway begins in Tallinn from Ülemiste and runs through the city for 2.9 kilometres. In the city, it intersects with the T1 in Ülemiste. After this, the road runs straight through the metro area of Tallinn, driving by towns such as Assaku, Rae and Pildiküla, while also bypassing Tallinn Airport. In Jüri, there is a roundabout interchange with the T11. The road continues as a dual carriageway. At Suuresta, the Pirita River is crossed. The road bypasses boroughs such as Vaida and Aruvalla.

After Aruvalla, a new section of dual carriageway is entered, which was completed in 2012. At Saula, Viikingite Küla, the road passes a viking-themed theme park. The Pirita River is crossed again. At Kose, there is an interchange with the T12. Shortly after this, the dual carriageway continues on a new piece of 2+2 dual carriageway for 28 km to Võõbu at 120 km/h making it the first dual carriageway in Estonia to allow more than 110 km/h. At Kose-Risti, the road intersects with the T14.

Between Võõbu and Mäo, the road is a regular 1+1 highway but works are underway to make it a 2+2 highway which is planned to be completed by 2022. At Mäo, the road briefly turns into a dual carriageway with the speed limit of 110 km/h. Here, there is an interchange with the T5. The road stays a dual carriageway for 5.9 km, after which it again turns into a 1+1 road. At Imavere, the road intersects with the T49. Most traffic to Viljandi exits the road here, due to the T49 leading straight to Viljandi.
Shortly after, the road crosses Põltsamaa River and passes the town of Põltsamaa. The road intersects with the T38 and T37 here.

At Puurmani, the Pedja River is crossed. At Kärevere, the Emajõgi is crossed. Shortly after, the road intersects with the T40. The following 10-kilometre section is also known as the Tartu Western Bypass. The road here intersects with major Estonian roads, such as the T92, T3 and Tartu Eastern Bypass. At Ülenurme, the road bypasses Tartu Airport. After this, the road intersects with the T61 and T46.

At Võru, the Võhandu river, the longest river in Estonia, is crossed. After an intersection with Võru's Tallinna maantee, the Võru Bypass is entered. Here, the road intersects with the T64, T65 and T66. Finally, at Lüta, the road ends when intersecting with the T7.

Currently there are 22 speed cameras on the T2, between kilometres 41 and 150.

Road length of lane

Gallery

See also

European route E263

References

External links

N2